The Braničevci (also Branichevci or Branichevtsi) were a South Slavic tribe that inhabited the region of Braničevo, in what is today Serbia, during the Middle Ages.

Initially subjects of the Pannonian Avars with the arrival of the Bulgars came under Bulgarian control in the late 7th century, but for a good period of time between the mid-8th and early 9th century local Slavs lived in anarchy until around 805 when the area was reconquered and reimposed control by the First Bulgarian Empire Khan Krum defeating in the process the remains of the Avar Khaganate. The annexed territories would serve as a frontier to Franks who also exerted control in Lower Pannonia.

In 818 during the rule of Omurtag (814-836) Braničevci, together with other tribes of Timočani and Abodrites of the Northwestern Bulgarian frontier, revolted because of administrative reform of centralization started by Krum and continued by Omurtag that deprived them of much of their local authority, increased their tribute and conscription, inciting them to desertion and ask protection from the Frankish ruler Louis the Pious. The area would be of a dispute between the Franks and Bulgars as Omurtag sent embassies in 824 and 826 seeking to settle the border dispute, but was neglected. They were eventually reconquered in 827 when Omurtag militarily advanced and imposed new local Bulgarian chieftains meeting little resistance.

Some researchers connect them to the Praedenecenti mentioned in the Royal Frankish Annals in 822–824. The Arab geographer al-Masʿūdī possibly mention them as Barānījābīn in a list of Slavic tribes after the Moravians (Murāwa), Croats (Kharwātīn), Saxons or Czechs (Sāsīn) and Kashubians or Guduscani (Khashānīn).

References

South Slavic tribes
9th century in Serbia
First Bulgarian Empire